Amna Lihović (born 8 February 1997) is a Bosnian footballer who plays as a midfielder and has appeared for the Bosnia and Herzegovina women's national team.

Career
Lihović has been capped for the Bosnia and Herzegovina national team, appearing for the team during the 2019 FIFA Women's World Cup qualifying cycle. she plays for Qviding FIF. Previously she played for Jitex BK, Kungsbacka DFF. She played for Swedish nationalteam U15 and U19 before she went to Bosnia and Hercegovina national team.

References

External links
 
 
 

1997 births
Living people
Bosnia and Herzegovina women's footballers
Bosnia and Herzegovina women's international footballers
Women's association football midfielders